Peter Robinson (29 January 1922 – 9 September 2000) was an English professional footballer who played in the Football League for Notts County, Chesterfield and Manchester City as a wing half. After retiring from football, he managed Macclesfield Town and Hyde United in non-League football and later served in backroom roles at Manchester City and Preston North End.

Career statistics

References 

English Football League players
English footballers
British Army personnel of World War II
Association football wing halves
Footballers from Manchester
Military personnel from Manchester
British Army soldiers
1922 births
2000 deaths
Manchester City F.C. players
Chesterfield F.C. players
Buxton F.C. players
Notts County F.C. players
King's Lynn F.C. players
Macclesfield Town F.C. players
Macclesfield Town F.C. managers
Hyde United F.C. managers
Manchester City F.C. non-playing staff
Preston North End F.C. non-playing staff
Aldershot F.C. wartime guest players
Queens Park Rangers F.C. wartime guest players
Clapton Orient F.C. wartime guest players
English football managers